Humaid Almas (Arabic:حميد ألماس) (born 21 June 1992) is an Emirati footballer who plays as a midfielder.

External links

References

Emirati footballers
1992 births
Living people
Fujairah FC players
Dibba FC players
Al Jazira Club players
UAE Pro League players
UAE First Division League players
Association football midfielders